The 2nd Law World Tour was a worldwide concert tour by English alternative rock band Muse. It was the band's eighth concert tour, which supported their sixth studio album The 2nd Law. Muse announced the tour via their official website and Twitter account on 7 June 2012. The European summer stadium tour was called The Unsustainable Tour, and saw the band's biggest stadium tour to date.

A live album and video of the tour, Live at Rome Olympic Stadium, was released in cinemas and on CD, DVD and Blu-Ray in November 2013. The release featured their performance at the Stadio Olimpico in Rome in July 2013, in front of a crowd of 60,963 people, in addition to a few songs from the arena leg of the tour. At the conclusion of 2013, the tour was placed on Pollstar's annual "Year End Top 20 Worldwide Tours", and appeared 13th worldwide, earning over $103 million with 79 shows in 2013. The 2nd Law World Tour sold over 1.7 million tickets, making it the biggest tour in the history of the band yet.

Tour dates 

Festivals and other miscellaneous performances

Cancellations and rescheduled shows

References

External links
Muse.mu – Muse's Official Website

2012 concert tours
2013 concert tours
2014 concert tours
Muse (band) concert tours